A search-and-rescue dog is one trained to find missing people after a natural or man-made disaster. The dogs detect human scent and have been known to find people under water, under snow, and under collapsed buildings.

Applications

Human remain detection dog's (HRDD's) or "cadaver dogs" are specially trained search and recuse canines used to detect the scent of buried or concealed deceased human remains, body parts and biological fluids. In Croatia such dogs have been used to find burial sites almost 3000 years old. More recently, HRDD's have been used in Canada and the United States to locate unmarked graves of Indeginous children around former residential school cites.  Police, death investigators and anthropologists may work closely with cadaver dogs and their handlers.

Training

Training of a search dog usually begins when the dog is still a puppy. Typically training takes two to four years before the dog passes the required tests.  Common dog breeds used for search-and-rescue work include German Shepherd, Labrador Retriever and Golden Retriever.  Individual dogs are selected and trained for behaviours related to successful field work. In training, dogs must demonstrate a willingness to work despite distractions, proper command control, and the ability to learn through positive reward reinforcement.  Cadaver dog training requires regular and repeated exposure to target scents. Training aids can include a combination of mock scent chemical formulations, animal remains and human remains.

Organizations
Numerous countries, cities and regions have search and rescue organizations using dog-and-handler teams that can be mobilized in an emergency or disaster. Here are a few organizations.

 International Rescue Dog Organisation (IRO) is the worldwide umbrella organisation for training and testing of search and rescue dog work. IRO partners with International Search and Rescue Advisory Group and United Nations for coordinating disaster relief missions worldwide.
 FEMA Urban Search and Rescue Task Force, US teams of dogs and handlers which are deployed to emergency and disaster sites within hours.
 Emergency Response Team Search and Rescue respond to emergencies and disasters in United Kingdom and Canada.
 Special Tasks and Rescue Dog Operations Unit supports the South Australia Police with tracking, searching, and finding lost persons.
 Canada Search Dog Association is a non-profit volunteer run organization of handlers and canines who conduct local searches and conduct public education events. 
 Alabama Search and Rescue supports public safety agencies in Alabama with tracking, searching, and finding lost persons using scent discrimination trailing Bloodhounds. www.ALSAR.gov

Notable dogs

 Beauty, a Wirehaired Terrier, was a search and rescue dog during the Second World War in England.
 Frida (2009-2022) was a yellow Labrador Retriever and a search and rescue dog for the Mexican Navy (SEMAR).
 Jake, a Labrador Retriever, was a search and rescue dog that worked the disasters of the September 11 attacks (2001) and Hurricane Katrina (2005).
 Orion, a Rottweiler, helped save the lives of at least 37 people in 1999 from drowning during flash floods in Vargas, Venezuela.
 Rex, entered burning buildings to find trapped people during the Second World War in England.
 Mancs, a German Shepherd trained to find people buried by earthquakes.
 Anonymous Newfoundland that learned to push children into the Seine in 1908 to earn a beefsteak reward

See also

References

External links

 
Working dogs
Detection dogs
Rescue
Dogs in warfare